Vindication is the third album released by the Florida-based hard rock music group Crease. The album was released in 2000, via Roadrunner Records. "Frustration" was featured in the film "Thank You, Good Night". "Jenny 867-5309" was featured in an episode of TV's "Roswell" and the video game "ESPN X-Games Skateboarding". "Building Up" was used by HBO in their documentary "Middle School Confessions".

Track listing
 "Vindication" – :30
 "Gravity" – 2:53
 "Frustration" – 4:32
 "Just For A Second" – 4:07
 "I'm The One" – 2:57
 "Spin Around" – 3:33
 "Jenny 867-5309" – 3:14
 "Making Progress" – 3:28
 "Butterfly Stitches" – 3:44
 "Building Up" – 3:36
 "Non-User" – 2:41
 "Stuck Like Chuck" – 2:28
 "Watch What You Wish For" – 13:11

Personnel
Crease:
Kelly Meister – lead vocals
Fritz Dorigo – guitars, vocals
Greg Gershengorn – bass, vocals
Eric Dorigo – drums, percussion

Addition Personal:
Chris Crane – keyboards, programming

Production
Paul Trust – producer, mixer, engineer
Crease – producer
Robert Succio – engineer
Keith Rose – engineer

References

2000 albums